Geranium bohemicum is a species of flowering plant belonging to the family Geraniaceae.

Its native range is Europe to Caucasus.

References

bohemicum